Masashi Ishibashi (Japanese: 石橋 政嗣 Ishibashi Masashi, October 6, 1924 – December 9, 2019) was a Japanese politician who served as chairman of the Japan Socialist Party from 1983 to 1986.

Biography

Early life 
Born in colonial Taiwan, he graduated from what today is Taipei Municipal Jianguo High School and afterwards enrolled at Taipei Higher Commercial School, which today is National Taiwan University. Ishibashi was conscripted in 1944 and later reached the rank of apprentice officer by the end of World War II.

In 1947, he formed a labor union for the "labor service corps" of the American occupation of Japan and was its general secretary.

Political career 
He began his political life as a member of the Nagasaki Prefectural Assembly, being elected in 1951. He was elected to the House of Representatives (Japan) for the first time in 1955, running from Nagasaki 2nd district for the Leftist Socialist Party of Japan. In 1966, Ishibashi advocated for the "unarmed neutrality" policy, in which the Japan Self-Defense Forces would be reorganised into a national police force and gradually reduced until an unarmed and diplomatically neutral state can be achieved.

Only a few months preceding the 1983 general elections, Ishibashi assumed the role of chairman for the Japan Socialist Party (JSP). Ishibashi and the JSP cooperated with other opposition parties and moderated their party platform a bit to the right. As a result, the JSP weathered the 1983 elections fairly well and saw its long-running decline in fortunes slow down. In 1984, Ishibashi became the first ever serving chairman of the JSP to visit the United States, calling on Secretary of Defense Caspar Weinberger during Ishibashi's stay in Washington, D.C. Ishibashi also visited North Korea for five days and had talks with Kim Il-sung in late September 1984.

In 1986, under Ishibashi's tenure, the JSP adopted a new program entitled the "New Declaration of the Japan Socialist Party" which saw the party shift in a direction closer to western-style social democratic parties. Unfortunately for Ishibashi, this program did not convince voters that meaningful reform would come from the JSP (as opposed to mavericks within the LDP such as Prime Minister Yasuhiro Nakasone), and as a result the JSP lost 27 seats in the 1986 general elections, and also saw its popular vote fall by 2.26% compared to the previous 1983 election. As is normal in Japanese politics, Ishibashi resigned from his position as chairman following this crushing defeat.

Later life 
In later years, he acted as an advisor for JSP chairwoman Takako Doi in strengthening cooperation with centrist parties. Ishibashi's reputation as an inter-party compromiser was seen in the fact that he refused to go along with chairwoman Doi's request that Ishibashi help campaign for an ambitious 180 candidates being fielded by the JSP for the 1990 general election, as this would involve hurting the electoral prospects of centrist allies. The same year as that election, Ishibashi retired from the political world.

After retiring, he turned to memoir writing. In 1994, he was offered the Grand Cordon of the Order of the Rising Sun, but he declined. For the next decade, he turned down similar awards which came every year. Ishibashi died at a Fukuoka hospital in 2019 as a result of old age.

References

|-

|-

1924 births
2019 deaths
Members of the House of Representatives (Japan)
Social Democratic Party (Japan) politicians
National Taiwan University alumni